Wayne Ulugia (born 8 May 1992) is a New Zealand professional rugby league footballer. He previously played for the North Queensland Cowboys in the National Rugby League and Hull Kingston Rovers in the Super League.

Background
Born in Auckland, New Zealand, Ulugia played his junior football for the Papakura Sea Eagles before moving to Townsville, Queensland to play for the Burdekin Roosters.

At the end of 2006, Ulugia was signed by the North Queensland Cowboys. He played for the Cowboys' NYC team from 2009 to 2012.

On 31 August 2012, Ulugia re-signed with the Cowboys on a 2-year contract.

In Round 24 of the 2013 NRL season, Ulugia made his NRL début for the Cowboys against the Newcastle Knights. He scored two tries on debut.

On 30 January 2014, the North Queensland Cowboys sacked Ulugia due to breaches of their club code of conduct.

In April 2014, Ulugia signed a 2-year contract with the Hull Kingston Rovers of the Super League starting effective immediately.

On 30 June 2014, the Hull Kingston Rovers sacked Ulugia due to 'repeated breaches of club discipline.' 

In November 2014, the townsville Blackhawks announced they have signed Ulugia along with 9 other players for their 2015 roster.

In 2015, Ulugia has been playing for Norths in the Townsville and District Rugby League Competition.

Representative career
In 2007, Ulugia played for the Australian Schoolboys U15's team.

In 2009, Ulugia played for the Queensland and Australian Schoolboys teams.

In 2011, Ulugia played for the Junior Kiwis.

In 2013, Ulugia was named in the Samoan 2013 Rugby League World Cup training squad.

References

External links
2013 North Queensland Cowboys profile

1992 births
Living people
New Zealand rugby league players
New Zealand sportspeople of Samoan descent
North Queensland Cowboys players
Northern Pride RLFC players
Hull Kingston Rovers players
Junior Kiwis players
Rugby league fullbacks
Rugby league wingers
Rugby league centres
Rugby league players from Auckland
Townsville Blackhawks players
Papakura Sea Eagles players